Alfonso Reyes Ochoa (17 May 1889 in Monterrey, Nuevo León – 27 December 1959 in Mexico City) was a Mexican writer, philosopher and diplomat. He was nominated for the Nobel Prize in Literature five times and has been acclaimed as one of the greatest authors in Spanish language. He served as ambassador of Mexico to Argentina and Brazil.

Biography 

He was the ninth of the twelve children of General Bernardo Reyes Ogazón, Governor of the State of Nuevo León and the Secretary of War and Navy of President Porfirio Díaz (considered by some to be his natural successor), and his wife Aurelia Ochoa-Garibay y Sapién, member of a prominent family of Jalisco, direct descendants of Conquistador Diego de Ochoa-Garibay, as documented by Reyes in his Parentalia.  

Reyes was educated at various colleges in Monterrey, El Liceo Francés de México, El Colegio Civil de Monterrey, and later at the Escuela Nacional Preparatoria and graduated from the La Escuela Nacional de Jurisprudencia, which later became the law school at UNAM in 1913.

In 1909, he helped to found the Ateneo de la Juventud, along with other young intellectuals including Martín Luis Guzmán, José Vasconcelos, Julio Torri, and Pedro Enríquez Ureña, to promote new cultural and aesthetic ideals and educational reform in Mexico. In 1911, Reyes published his first book, Cuestiones estéticas. The following year, he wrote the short story La Cena ("The Supper"), which is considered a forerunner of surrealism and Latin American magical realism. In that year he was also named Secretary of the Escuela Nacional de Altos Estudios at the National Autonomous University of Mexico.

Reyes obtained his law degree in 1913, the same year that his father died while he was participating in an coup d'état against the then President Francisco I. Madero.

Alfonso Reyes was posted to Mexico's diplomatic service in France in 1913. After Germany invaded France in 1914, he moved to Madrid, Spain, and pursued a literary career as journalist, investigator, translator, critic, and writer. In 1915, he wrote what is probably his best-known essay, Visión de Anáhuac (1519) with its famous epigraph, Viajero: has llegado a la región más transparente del aire, the source of the title of Carlos Fuentes's novel La región más transparente. Visión de Anáhuac is inspired by the “vitalist” philosophy of Henri Bergson and can be seen as a study on the metamorphosis in the process of creative evolution. 

Reyes was reinstated in the diplomatic service in 1920. He was the second secretary in Spain in 1920, was in Paris from 1924 to 1927, and then served as the ambassador to Argentina (1927–1930 and 1936–1937). He was the Mexican ambassador to Brazil from 1930 to 1935 and again in 1938. In 1939, he retired from the diplomatic corps and returned to Mexico, where he organized what is today El Colegio de México and dedicated himself to writing and teaching. He was elected to the American Philosophical Society in 1950.

Years in Spain
His time in Spain, where he resided from 1914 to 1924, was considered his best creative period when he became a great writer and master of literature.

In Spain, where he experienced financial difficulties, he dedicated himself to literature and combined it with journalism. He worked at the Centro de Estudios Históricos (Historical Study Center) of Madrid under the direction of Ramón Menéndez Pidal. In 1919, he was named the Mexican 
Commission Secretary "Francisco del Paso y Troncoso", the same year that Cantar de mio Cid was put into prose.

Many of his friends insisted that he was a natural in Spanish and should pursue a career in politics, but he declined to do so. One time he was presented with an offer to teach, but he rejected it. He was more interested in the aesthetics of Benedetto Croce. He published numerous essays about poetry of the Spanish Golden Age, such as Baroque y Góngora; on top of that he was one of the first writers to study poetry of Juana Inés de la Cruz. From 1917 he produced Cartones de Madrid, his small masterpiece, Visión de Anáhuac, El suicida, and in 1921, El cazador. He was a collaborator of Revista de Filología Española, Revista de Occidente and Revue Hispanique. His works about Spanish literature, older classical literature and aesthetics are notable, and among the more notable of that time, Cuestiones estéticas (1911). In Spain he organized a ceremony on 11 September 1923 at the Real Jardín Botánico de Madrid (Real Botanical Garden of Madrid) to honor the memory of the symbolic poet Stéphane Mallarmé.

After 1924 he developed a diplomatic and social life in Paris, Buenos Aires and Rio de Janeiro (he served as an ambassador of Mexico to Argentina and Brazil). He translated a Mallarmé and edited his own literary mail, "Monterrey," publishing it in 1930. He wrote to friends abroad in every part of the world and gave talks, spoke at conferences and contributed to homages and cultural events.

He published among others, "Cuestiones gongorinas" (1927), "Capítulos de literatura española" (1939–195), "Discurso por Virgilio" (1931). His poetic works reveal a profound knowledge of the formal means, notably "Ifigenia cruel" (1924), "Pausa" (1926), "5 casi sonetos" (1931), "Otra voz" (1936) and "Cantata en la tumba de Federico García Lorca" (1937).

Reyes worked as a translator of works from Laurence Sterne, G.K. Chesterton, Anton Chekhov and as an editor of works by Ruiz de Alarcón, Cantar del Mio Cid, Lope de Vega, Baltasar Gracián, Juan Ruiz, Francisco de Quevedo.

Legacy 
The Argentinian writer Jorge Luis Borges referred to Reyes as "the greatest prose writer in the Spanish language of any age". At least five avenues in Monterrey's metropolitan area, three in the municipality and one in Mexico City are named after Reyes.

There are many monuments build in honor of Alfonso Reyes in different Spanish speaking countries around the World.

On 17 May 2018, Google Doodle commemorated Alfonso Reyes' 129th birthday.

Works 

The Fondo de Cultura Económica published his complete works in 26 volumes, titled Obras Completas de Alfonso Reyes.

Nonfiction 
Cuestiones estéticas
El suicida
Visión de Anáhuac
Vísperas de España
Cartones de Madrid
Simpatías y diferencias
Calendario
Homília por la cultura
Capítulos de literatura española
Pasado inmediato
Estudios helénicos
La filosofía helenística
La X en la frente
Memorias de cocina y bodega
Las burlas veras
La experiencia literaria

Fiction 
Los tres tesoros
El plano oblicuo
Árbol de pólvora
Quince presencias

Poetry 
Huellas
Ifigenia cruel
Yerbas del tarahumara
Minuta
Homero en Cuernavaca

See also 
Alfonso Reyes International Prize
 Alfonso Reyes (Monterrey Metro)
Enrique Díez Canedo, a Spanish writer and translator, friend of Alfonso Reyes who called his house in Mexico City "la Capilla Alfonsina"
Homero en Cuernavaca. Estudio preliminar de Arturo Dávila, Universidad Autónoma de Nuevo León, 2013. 
List of people from Morelos, Mexico

References

External links 
The web page of Alfonso Reyes' house in Mexico City, known as "la Capilla Alfonsina".
Robb, James Willis Distinguished professor at The George Washington University and a published authority on Alfonso Reyes left his research documents on Mr. Reyes to the university library for scholarly research.

1889 births
1959 deaths
Members of El Colegio Nacional (Mexico)
Mexican essayists
Male essayists
Mexican male poets
20th-century Mexican philosophers
Writers from Monterrey
Hellenists
Mexican translators
Members of the Mexican Academy of Language
Ambassadors of Mexico to Brazil
Ambassadors of Mexico to Argentina
20th-century Mexican poets
20th-century translators
20th-century essayists
20th-century Mexican male writers